Greatest Hits is a greatest hits album by Eurodance group the Vengaboys and features songs from both their debut album "The Party Album" and also their second album "The Platinum Album". The album is now available on other streaming services such as Google Play Music and YouTube Music.

It was released in Australia in 2011 under the title The Best of Vengaboys.

Track listing

Certifications

References

Vengaboys albums